Karkhaneh-ye Ard may refer to:

Karkhaneh-ye Ard, Semnan